Coming Out Under Fire is a 1994 documentary film directed and produced by Arthur Dong and narrated by actress Salome Jens. Based on Allan Bérubé's book of the same title, the film examines the attitudes toward homosexuality in the United States Armed Forces during World War II.

Dong and Bérubé co-wrote the screenplay. It was funded with grants from the National Endowment for the Arts and the Corporation for Public Broadcasting 1994). Other credits include: Director of photography, Stephen Lighthill; edited by Veronica Selver; music by Mark Adler. It was released by Zeitgeist Films and had a running time of 71 minutes. 

The film aired nationally on PBS in June 1995. It was released on home video in 1996 and on DVD in 2003.

Awards
Special Jury Recognition For Technical Achievement at the Sundance Film Festival, 1994.
Teddy Award at the Berlin International Film Festival, 1994.
George Foster Peabody Award for Excellence in Television Broadcasting 1995.
 GLAAD Media Award Best Documentary

See also
 Bibliography of works on the United States military and LGBT+ topics

References

External links
Official Website from Deep Focus Productions
Coming Out Under Fire at the Internet Movie Database
Review of the film, The New York Times

1994 films
American documentary films
Documentary films about LGBT topics
Films directed by Arthur Dong
Peabody Award-winning broadcasts
Sexual orientation and the United States military
1994 documentary films
Documentary films about World War II
LGBT and military-related mass media
1994 LGBT-related films
1990s English-language films
1990s American films